No. 10 Group RAF was a former operations group of the Royal Air Force which participated in the Second World War.

History
It was formed on 1 April 1918 in No. 2 Area. On 8 May of the next year it was transferred to South-Western Area. In 1919 it was transferred to Coastal Area where it remained until it was disbanded on 18 January 1932.

The group was re-formed on 1 June 1940 within Fighter Command to enable neighbouring No. 11 Group to function more efficiently. Its area of operation was the south-western region of England. Commanded by Air Vice Marshal Sir Quintin Brand, 10 Group supported 11 Group in the Battle of Britain by rotating squadrons, providing additional fighter support when needed, and supplying additional pilots.  The Air Officer Commanding (AOC) of 11 Group, Air Vice Marshal Keith Park, had a far warmer relationship with Brand than with the AOC of 12 Group, Air Vice Marshal Trafford Leigh-Mallory, who regarded Park with jealousy.

As well as providing support for 11 Group, 10 Group also had some squadrons of aircraft that could not be risked in the Battle of Britain (Gloster Gladiator, Boulton Paul Defiant).

Brown's Quarry, a small quarry north of Tunnel Quarry, was converted into an underground operations centre for HQ No. 10 Group, RAF Box.

After the Battle of Britain, 10 Group also provided fighter cover missions for convoys approaching and leaving the British Isles.  Pilots rotated into 10 Group from either 12 or 13 Group knew that soon they would go over to 11 Group, so the pilots took advantage of their comparatively safer area of operation to hone their skills.

No. 10 Group was reabsorbed into No. 11 Group on 2 May 1945.

Order of Battle 1 August 1940
On 1 August 1940 when air attacks began on the UK, the group was organised into several sectors:
 Group Headquarters at RAF Rudloe Manor
 No. 152 (Hyderabad) Squadron RAF at RAF Warmwell equipped with Supermarine Spitfire
 No. 247 (China-British) Squadron RAF at RNAS Roborough equipped with Gloster Gladiator
 No. 5 Operational Training Unit RAF at RAF Aston Down equipped with Supermarine Spitfire and Bristol Blenheim
 No. 6 Operational Training Unit RAF at RAF Sutton Bridge equipped with Hawker Hurricane
 No. 7 Operational Training Unit RAF at RAF Hawarden equipped with Hawker Hurricane and Supermarine Spitfire
 Middle Wallop Sector
 Sector Headquarters at RAF Middle Wallop
 No. 234 (Madras Presidency) Squadron RAF armed with Supermarine Spitfire
 No. 604 (County of Middlesex) Squadron RAF armed with Bristol Blenheim
 No. 609 (West Riding) Squadron RAF armed with Supermarine Spitfire
 Filton Sector
 Sector Headquarters at RAF Filton
 Care and Maintenance Party at RAF Filton
 Exeter Sector
 Sector Headquarters at RAF Exeter
 No. 87 (United Provinces) Squadron RAF armed with Hawker Hurricane
 No. 213 (Ceylon) Squadron RAF armed with Hawker Hurricane
 Pembrey Sector
 Sector Headquarters at RAF Pembrey
 No. 92 (East India) Squadron RAF armed with Supermarine Spitfire
 No. 238 Squadron RAF armed with Hawker Hurricane

Commanders
The following officers have been in command of 10 Group:

1918 to 1932
 1 April 1918 Lieutenant Colonel (later Colonel) A W Bigsworth
 1 August 1919 Group Captain H P Smyth Osbourne
 27 July 1921 Group Captain J L Forbes
 1 December 1924 Air Commodore E A D Masterman
 6 April 1928 Air Commodore T C R Higgins
 1 November 1929 Air Commodore A W Bigsworth
 1 October 1931 Wing Commander L C Kemble (possibly a temporary appointment)
 1 November 1931 Group Captain (later Air Commodore) N J Gill

1940 to 1945
 15 June 1940 Air Vice-Marshal Sir Quintin Brand
 22 July 1941 Air Vice-Marshal A H Orlebar
 4 November 1942 Air Vice-Marshal W F Dickson
 5 May 1943 Air Vice-Marshal C R Steele
 3 June 1944 Air Commodore A V Harvey
 10 July 1944 Air Vice-Marshal J B Cole-Hamilton
 Nov 1944 Unknown

See also
 List of Royal Air Force groups
 RAF Fighter Command
 Battle of Britain
 List of Battle of Britain airfields
 List of Battle of Britain squadrons

References

010
Royal Air Force units and formations of the Battle of Britain
Military units and formations established in 1918
Military units and formations disestablished in 1932
Military units and formations established in 1940
010
Military units and formations disestablished in 1945
1918 establishments in the United Kingdom